Abish-Kyand is a village in the Bilasuvar Rayon of Azerbaijan.

References

External links 
Satellite map at Maplandia.com 

Populated places in Bilasuvar District